Ivica Marić (born 3 September 1974) is a Croatian retired football goalkeeper.

References

1974 births
Living people
People from Derventa
Association football goalkeepers
Croatian footballers
HNK Cibalia players
HNK Rijeka players
Croatian Football League players